Web usability of a website are broad goals of usability and presentation of information and choices in a clear and concise way, a lack of ambiguity and the placement of important items in appropriate areas as well as ensuring that the content works on various devices and browsers. The end-goal a website creator wants to achieve is to provide the users of the website a better experience.

˝Unless a web site meets the needs of the intended users it will not meet the needs of the organization providing the web site. Web site development should be user-centred, evaluating the evolving design against user requirements˝

Web Usability definition and components

Web Usability includes a small learning curve, easy content exploration, findability, task efficiency, user satisfaction, and automation. These new components of usability are due to the evolution of the Web and personal devices. Examples: automation: auto fill, databases, personal account; efficiency: voice command (Siri, Alexa,...etc); findability. The number of websites has surpassed 1.5 billion thus increasing the need for well-designed websites that serve its users as best as possible in the constantly more competitive market. With good usability, users can find what they are looking for quickly. With the wide spread of mobile devices and wireless internet access, companies are now able to reach a global market with users of all nationalities at any time and almost any place in the world. It is important for websites to be usable regardless of users' language and culture. Most users in developed countries conduct their personal business online: banking, studying, errands, etc., which has enabled people with disabilities to be independent. Websites also need to be accessible for those users.

The goal of Web usability is to provide user experience satisfaction by minimizing the time it takes to the user to learn new functionality and page navigation system, allowing the user to accomplish a task efficiently without major roadblocks, providing the user easy ways to overcome roadblocks, and fixing errors and re-adapting to the website or application system and functionality with minimum effort.

˝Management and maintenance is important to maintain usability.˝

Ergonomic Requirement Approach

According to ISO 9241(Ergonomic Requirements for Office Work with Visual Display Terminals), usability is "the extent to which a product can be used by specified users to achieve specified goals with effectiveness, efficiency and satisfaction in a specified context of use". Therefore, web usability can be defined as the ability of Web applications to support web-related tasks with effectiveness, efficiency and satisfaction. Effectiveness represents accuracy and completeness when users achieve a specified goal. Efficiency is resource cost in relation to the accuracy and completeness. Satisfaction is the comfort and acceptability of use.

ADA Compliance and Web Usability

Web sites and application should be made usable for all users. ADA compliance play a major part in making web usability a seamless and satisfying experience. See
Americans with Disabilities Act of 1990.

Mobile Usability 

With so many different mobile devices (screen size, make,..), it is crucial to consider how the users accomplish their task on a small screen. Web usability components should be met for the mobile device. The users should be awarded with the same feeling of satisfaction and accomplishment as if they had used a desktop or laptop.
- See also "Mobile Usability" by Jacob Nielsen

Not only is the screen different, nowadays mobile users want different things than desktop users. According to a survey conducted by Google, users want mobile friendly websites as they use them every day for different tasks, i.e. research. Moreover, if a web site is mobile friendly, the users are more likely to return to it but are quick to leave if it is not. In summary, they want a website that is fast and simple to use - quick to load, has big buttons and readable text, and offer a way of engagement (videos, apps, social media, and other ways to contact the company). The three most sough-after things while browsing mobile are locations, opening hours and contact information. Make sure to include them.

Check mobile-friendliness of a web site here.

Usability for Multilingual Websites 

Multilingual websites should offer the same experience to the users, regardless of the website being in english, German, or Japanese. Websites should render the same way in all languages and all devices. UI Alterations because the language and characters used should still provide the different components of usability.

Web Usability Criteria

Nielsen's 10 heuristics 

Jakob Nielsen's heuristics are widely adopted in Interface Design. It provides expert reviewers with a set of principles to discover usability problems and then categorize and rate them in a quick way. This set of heuristics includes Visibility of system status, Match between system and the real world and so on. According to Jakob Nielsen, there are 10 general principles:

 Visibility of system status: the users should be informed by a system all the time that people can make better decisions.
 Match between system and the real world: the systems' language should be similar to users' language.
 User control and freedom: It happens many times that users choose the wrong system functions by a mistake, therefore, the system needs to contain the "emergency exit" to give an option for users to leave the unwanted state without any problem.
 Consistency and standards: the users have to be aware that different words, actions and situations can mean the same thing.
 Error prevention: System should have a careful design that can prevent a problem that can occur in the first place. 
 Recognition rather than recall: the system should have the actions and options visible so the users do not need to memorize everything from previous steps. Instructions about the system usability should be always visible. 
 Flexibility and efficiency of use: the system should have an accelerator to help experienced and inexperienced users to make work faster and easier.
 Aestetic and minimalist design: the systems needs to contain only relevant and useful information. The information should be clear and short.
 Help users recognize, diagnose, and recover from errors: the error messages should be presented in a clear language and understandable form (no codes), and suggest the solutions. 
 Help and documentation: the information about help and documentation should be easy to find and should focus on the users' tasks.

Web Content Accessibility Guidelines 

The W3C publishes a set of guidelines on Web accessibility called Web Content Accessibility Guidelines (WGAC).

The second revision of WCAG, WCAG 2.0, is composed of twelve guidelines, distilled following the four principles that Web content should adhere to: being Perceivable, Operable, Understandable and Robust.

W3C also provides a detailed checklist for this set of guidelines.

Universal Usability Challenges
To attain universal usability for Web-based services, designers and developers should take technology variety, user diversity and gaps in user knowledge into consideration.

Technology variety arises from a broad range of hardware, software, and network access. People are using different hardware and software to access web services. For example, reading a document with smartphone doc reader is different from opening this document with Microsoft Office on a laptop. Also, opening a webpage with 100KB/s bandwidth may lead to failure when it's designed for 2MB/s. Ensuring usability of different platforms can be challenging.

User diversity influenced by many factors, including culture, personality, age, gender, race, ethnicity, disabilities, literacy, income, skills and knowledge. Considering the need of different groups is providing access to more people. For example, providing strong contrast mode for people with color weakness will help those people utilize the web service.

Universal usability means not only meet users’ current needs, but also build ladders for users to enjoy more features of web services in the future. This gap in user knowledge can be filled with training section, help desk, discuss group and so on. Designers should be aware of the need of extra help.

Communication between the designer and the client is also a challenge as it can be hard for the designer to make what the client has envisioned, while the client not fully understanding the amount of time and work required to set up a well designed website. Furthermore, it is also crucial that the designer gives suggestions based on the clients ideas, which is supported by evidence/theory/examples of usability and other functions of the website too. Constant and open communication is important because conflicts or misunderstandings can arise between the two parties.

Understanding Usability 
To understand what usability is and what it means it is important to look at it from the customers' perspective.

According to Steve Krug nowadays digital literacy is quite high and increasing year-by-year and ˝how we really use the internet˝ has changed.

We have become so used to using the internet and different websites that we do not read them any more but rather scan through them because we are usually in a hurry to find something and have become so used to web pages that there is no need for us to read through them completely as we can successfully filter through and find only the information we need and read more about it should the information found not suffice our needs.

Furthermore, we do not care to make the most optimal choices when browsing the web but instead the choices that satisfy our needs - we satisfice. This is again because we are usually in a hurry and there are no real consequences for choosing the incorrect option (i.e. clicking the wrong link) as the back button is only a click away to solve the issue. Similarly, there is no penalty for guessing, thus weighing the options of which button to click and if it will yield the desired results is a waste of time and thought.

Because of that we don't care enough to understand what we are doing as long as we can use the functions.

The effect of that is that users may develop unexpected thinking patterns and ways of using a website - differently than it was intended. Thus, it is important to test each website and its usability.

Usability Testing and Improvement
Usability testing is evaluating the different components of web usability (learnability, efficiency, memorability, errors and satisfaction) by watching the users accomplishing their task.
Usability testing allows to uncover the roadblocks and errors users encounter while accomplishing a task. However, testing is not a one time event but rather an ongoing process. In order to test a web site, we need to have ways of measurement in place. We need to analyze the data gathered and make a plan of improvements, which will be implemented later. After a successful implementation the site needs to be tested again and the process should be repeated again.

Evaluation Methods

As more results of usability research become available, this leads to the development of methodologies for enhancing web usability. There are a number of usability testing tools available in the market.

 Usability testing
 Heuristic evaluation
 Cognitive walkthrough
 Web analytics
International Usability Testing

E-commerce
In the context of e-commerce websites, the meaning of web-usability is narrowed down to efficiency: triggering sales and/or performing other transactions valuable to the business.

Web usability received renewed attention as many early e-commerce websites started failing in 2000.  Whereas fancy graphical design had been regarded as indispensable for a successful e-business application during the emergence of internet in the 1990s, web-usability protagonists said quite the reverse was true. They advocated the KISS principle (keep it simple, stupid), which had proven to be effective in focusing end-user attention.

See also

 Eye tracking, a fast and accurate usability tool
 Multivariate testing, a statistical testing of user responses
 Jakob Nielsen (usability consultant)
 Web development
 Web navigation

References

External links

 Usability.gov—usability basics with focus on web usability
 Evaluating Web Sites for Accessibility—accessibility is a crucial subset of usability for people with disabilities. This W3C/WAI suite includes a section on involving users in testing for accessibility.
 Usability News from the Software Usability Research Laboratory at Wichita State University

Usability
Web design

pl:Użyteczność (informatyka)